The Pier is a 2011 Irish romantic drama film written and directed by Gerard Hurley and starring Karl Johnson, Hurley and Lili Taylor.

Cast
Karl Johnson as Larry McCarthy
Gerard Hurley as Jack McCarthy
Lili Taylor as Grace Ross
Mary Foskett as June Driscoll

References

External links
 
 

Irish drama films
2011 drama films
2011 films
2010s English-language films